is the 6th single from Japanese idol group Keyakizaka46. It was released on March 7, 2018 under Sony Music Records. The music video for the title track is filmed in Suwa, Nagano and features Yurina Hirate as center.

Track listing

Type A

Type B

Type C

Type D

Regular edition

Participating members

"Glass wo Ware!" 
Center: Yurina Hirate

 1st row: Mizuho Habu, Miyu Suzumoto, Yui Kobayashi, Yurina Hirate, Yui Imaizumi, Minami Koike, Risa Watanabe
 2nd row: Manaka Shida, Rina Uemura, Yūka Sugai, Neru Nagahama, Akane Moriya, Rika Ozeka, Rika Watanabe
 3rd row: Fuyuka Saitō, Nanako Nagasawa, Aoi Harada, Nana Oda, Nanami Yonetani, Shiori Satō, Nijika Ishimori

"Mou Mori e Kaerou ka?" 

Nijika Ishimori, Yui Imaizumi, Rina Uemura, Rika Ozeka, Nana Oda, Minami Koike, Yui Kobayashi, Fuyuka Saitō, Shiori Satō, Manaka Shida, Yūka Sugai, Miyu Suzumoto, Nanako Nagasawa, Neru Nagahama, Mizuho Habu, Aoi Harada, Yurina Hirate, Akane Moriya, Nanami Yonetani, Rika Watanabe, Risa Watanabe

"Yoake no Kodoku" 

Yurina Hirate

"Ima ni Mite iro" 
Center: Mirei Sasaki

Mao Iguchi, Sarina Ushio, Memi Kakizaki, Yūka Kameyama, Shiho Katō, Kyōko Saitō, Kumi Sasaki, Mirei Sasaki, Mana Takase, Ayaka Takamoto, Mei Higashimura

"Zenmai Shikake no Yume" 

Yui Imaizumi, Yui Kobayashi

"Bathroom Travel" 

Rika Ozeki, Minami Koike, Neru Nagahama

"Hanbun no Kioku" 

Center: Nao Kosaka

Miku Kanemura, Hina Kawata, Nao Kosaka, Suzuka Tomita, Akari Nibu, Hiyori Hamagishi, Konoka Matsuda, Manamo Miyata, Miho Watanabe

Charts

Weekly charts

Year-end charts

Certifications

References

Further reading

External links 
 Discography on the official website of Keyakizaka46
 

2018 singles
Keyakizaka46 songs
2018 songs
Songs with lyrics by Yasushi Akimoto
Sony Music Entertainment Japan singles
Oricon Weekly number-one singles
Billboard Japan Hot 100 number-one singles